Camera is a 2000 Canadian short film written and directed by David Cronenberg. The six-minute short was one of several made for the special Preludes program in celebration of the 25th anniversary of the Toronto International Film Festival. These films, all by Canadian directors, were commissioned as preludes for the festival in 2000.

The film was a Genie Award nominee for Best Live Action Short Film at the 22nd Genie Awards in 2002.

Synopsis

A seasoned actor (Leslie Carlson, in his fourth collaboration with Cronenberg) discusses the current state of film while a group of young children sneak in with production equipment to film him. The children are enamored with the camera, which the actor views as an infectious, malevolent presence.

Cast
Leslie Carlson  as The Actor
Marc Donato  as Lead
Harrison Kane  as Lead
Kyle Kass  as Lead (as Kyle Kassardjian)
Natasha La Force (as Natasha LaForce)
Katie Lai
Daniel Magder  as Director
Chloe Randle-Reis		(as Chloe Reis)
Stephanie Sams		
Camille Shniffer  as Lead

Home Video
Camera is available as a bonus feature on various DVD/Blu-Ray releases of Cronenberg's earlier film Videodrome.

References

External links

2000 films
Films directed by David Cronenberg
2000 short films
English-language Canadian films
Films about filmmaking
Films scored by Howard Shore
2000s English-language films
Canadian drama short films
2000s Canadian films